The Association of Baptist Churches in Israel (ABCI) is a Baptist association of churches in Israel. It is a member of the European Baptist Federation, the Baptist World Alliance and the Evangelical Alliance of Israel.

History
The Association has its origins in the founding of the first Baptist Church in Nazareth in 1911 by the Syrian Shukri Mosa.An American mission of the International Mission Board also established other churches in 1923. The Association was founded in 1965 by various Israeli Arab churches.

According to a denomination census released in 2020, it claimed 17 churches and 900 members.

Beliefs 
The Association has a Baptist confession of faith. It is a member of the Baptist World Alliance and the Convention of Evangelical Churches in Israel.

Schools
The association is a partner of the Nazareth Baptist School founded in 1936, a K–12 school. 

In 2007, it founded the Nazareth Centre for Christian Studies.  In 2014, the Centre merged with the Galilee Bible college to establish the Nazareth Evangelical College.

References

External links 
 Association of Baptist Churches in Israel - Official Web Site
 Baptist Twinning with Israel
 Jerusalem Baptist Church
 The Local Baptist Church - Nazareth
 Nazareth Baptist School - Official Web Site
 Nazareth Evangelical Theological Seminary
 Nazsem: the blog of Nazareth Evangelical Theological Seminary

Religious organizations established in the 1960s
Baptist denominations in Asia
Evangelicalism in Israel